There are over 20,000 Grade II* listed buildings in England. This page is a list of these buildings in the district of Swale in Kent.

Swale

|}

Notes

External links

Lists of Grade II* listed buildings in Kent
Grade II* listed buildings in Kent
Borough of Swale